| tries = {{#expr:

 8 + 3 + 2 + 6 + 3 + 10 + 5 + 5 + 3 + 5
 + 8 + 1 + 6 + 5 + 3 + 0 + 6 + 5 + 6 + 6
 + 8 + 4 + 5 + 6 + 6 + 6 + 1 + 9 + 6 + 2
 + 6 + 10 + 3 + 6 + 6 + 12 + 11 + 2 + 7 + 6
 + 7 + 8 + 6 + 8 + 6 + 3 + 3 + 5 + 4 + 4
 + 2 + 8 + 7 + 7 + 5 + 5 + 5 + 6 + 9 + 7
 
 
 
}}
| top point scorer =  Joe Simmonds  (Exeter Chiefs)95 points
| top try scorer =  Sam Simmonds (Exeter Chiefs)8 tries
| venue = Ashton Gate, Bristol
| attendance2 =
| champions =  Exeter Chiefs
| count = 1
| runner-up =  Racing 92
| website = http://www.epcrugby.com
| previous year = 2018–19
| previous tournament = 2018–19 European Rugby Champions Cup
| next year = 2020–21
| next tournament = 2020–21 European Rugby Champions Cup
}}

The 2019–20 European Rugby Champions Cup (known as the Heineken Champions Cup for sponsorship reasons) was the sixth season of the European Rugby Champions Cup, the annual club rugby union competition run by European Professional Club Rugby (ECPR) for teams from the top six nations in European rugby. It was the 25th season of pan-European professional club rugby competition.

The tournament began on 15 November 2019. The knock-out stage of the tournament was rescheduled from April and May to September and October 2020 due to the COVID-19 pandemic, with the final, originally scheduled for 23 May 2020 at the Stade Vélodrome in Marseille in France, taking place on 17 October 2020 at Ashton Gate in Bristol.

Teams
Twenty clubs from the three major European domestic and regional leagues competed in the Champions Cup. Nineteen of these qualified directly as a result of their league performance. The final place was awarded in the following order:
 2018–19 Champions Cup winner, if not already qualified.  Saracens have qualified through their league position.
 2018–19 Challenge Cup winner, if not already qualified.  Clermont have qualified through their league position.
 2018–19 Challenge Cup losing finalist, if not already qualified. La Rochelle have qualified through their league position.
 2018–19 Challenge Cup losing semi-finalist if not already qualified, or the winner of a play-off between both losing semi-finalists if neither have already qualified. As Harlequins have qualified through their league position, Sale Sharks took this place.
 Highest ranked non-qualified club by virtue of league position from the same league as the 2018–19 Champions Cup winner. This step will not be needed, as a team will have qualified via one of the previous steps.

The distribution of teams is:
 England: seven clubs
 The top six clubs in the English Premiership
 Sale Sharks also qualified as Challenge Cup losing semi-finalists because Saracens, Clermont, La Rochelle, and Harlequins all qualified through their league positions
 France: six clubs
 The top six clubs in the Top 14
 Ireland, Italy, Scotland, Wales: seven clubs
 The top three sides (not including the South African sides, which are ineligible for European competition) in both conferences in the Pro14
 The next best-placed eligible team in each conference will compete in a one-off play-off game to determine the 7th Pro14 team.

The following teams qualified for the tournament.

Team details
Below is the list of coaches, captain and stadiums with their method of qualification for each team.

Note: Placing shown in brackets, denotes standing at the end of the regular season for their respective leagues, with their end of season positioning shown through CH for Champions, RU for Runner-up, SF for losing Semi-finalist, QF for losing Quarter-finalist, and PO for the Pro14 7th place play-off winner.

Seeding
The twenty competing teams are seeded and split into four tiers, each containing five teams.

For the purpose of creating the tiers, clubs are ranked based on their domestic league performances and on their qualification for the knockout phases of their championships, so a losing quarter-finalist in the Top 14 would be seeded below a losing semi-finalist, even if they finished above them in the regular season.

Based on these seedings, teams are placed into one of the four tiers, with the top-seeded clubs being put in Tier 1. The nature of the tier system means that a draw is needed to allocate two of the three second-seed clubs to Tier 1. The fourth-seed team from the same domestic league as the second-seed team which was put in Tier 2 will also be placed in Tier 2. Brackets show each team's seeding and their league. e.g. 1 Top 14 indicates the team was the top seed from the Top 14.

The following restrictions will apply to the draw:
 Each pool will consist of four clubs, one from each Tier in the draw.
 Each pool must have one from each league drawn from Tier 1, 2, or 3. No pool will have a second team from the same league until the allocation of Tier 4 takes place.
 Where two Pro14 clubs compete in the same pool, they must be from different countries.

Pool stage

The draw took place on 19 June 2019, in Lausanne, Switzerland.

Teams in the same pool play each other twice, at home and away, in the group stage that begins on the weekend of 15–17 November 2019, and continues through to 17–19 January 2020. The five pool winners and three best runners-up progress to the quarter finals.

Teams are awarded group points based on match performances. Four points are awarded for a win, two points for a draw, one attacking bonus point for scoring four or more tries in a match and one defensive bonus point for losing a match by seven points or fewer.

In the event of a tie between two or more teams, the following tie-breakers are used, as directed by EPCR:
 Where teams have played each other
 The club with the greater number of competition points from only matches involving tied teams.
 If equal, the club with the best aggregate points difference from those matches.
 If equal, the club that scored the most tries in those matches.
 Where teams remain tied and/or have not played each other in the competition (i.e. are from different pools)
 The club with the best aggregate points difference from the pool stage.
 If equal, the club that scored the most tries in the pool stage.
 If equal, the club with the fewest players suspended in the pool stage.
 If equal, the drawing of lots will determine a club's ranking.

Pool 1

Pool 2

Pool 3

Pool 4

Pool 5

Ranking of pool leaders and runners-up

Knock-out stage

Bracket

Quarter-finals

Semi-finals

Final

Player scoring
 Appearance figures also include coming on as substitutes (unused substitutes not included).

Most points

Most tries

Season records

Team
Largest home win – 41 points
44–3 Saracens at home to Ospreys on 23 November 2019
Largest away win – 38 points 
45–7 Glasgow Warriors away to Sale Sharks on 18 January 2020
Most points scored – 53 points
53–21 Clermont at home to Harlequins on 16 November 2019
Most tries in a match – 8
Clermont at home to Bath on 15 December 2019
Most conversions in a match – 6 (4)
Clermont at home to Harlequins on 16 November 2019
Leinster at home to Northampton Saints on 14 December 2019
Clermont at home to Bath on 15 December 2019
Glasgow Warriors away to Sale Sharks on 18 January 2020
Most penalties in a match – 6
Northampton Saints at home to Lyon on 17 November 2019
Most drop goals in a match – 1 (3)
Toulouse away to Gloucester on 15 November 2019
Connacht away to Toulouse on 23 November 2019
Clermont at home to Ulster on 11 January 2020

Player
Most points in a match – 20
 Dan Biggar for Northampton Saints at home to Lyon on 17 November 2019
Most tries in a match – 3 (2)
 Garry Ringrose for Leinster at home to Benetton on 16 November 2019
 Garry Ringrose for Leinster at home to Northampton Saints on 14 December 2019
Most conversions in a match – 6
 Adam Hastings for Glasgow Warriors away to Sale Sharks on 18 January 2020
Most penalties in a match – 6
 Dan Biggar for Northampton Saints at home to Lyon on 17 November 2019
Most drop goals in a match – 1 (3)
 Zack Holmes for Toulouse away to Gloucester on 15 November 2019
 Conor Fitzgerald for Connacht away to Toulouse on 23 November 2019
 Camille Lopez for Clermont at home to Ulster on 11 January 2020

Attendances
Highest – 42,041
Leinster at home to Northampton Saints on 14 December 2019
Lowest – 3,114
Benetton at home to Lyon on 14 December 2019
Highest average attendance — 25,086
Leinster
Lowest average attendance — 3,607
Benetton

See also
 2019–20 European Rugby Challenge Cup

Notes

References

 
Champions Cup
European Rugby Champions Cup
European Rugby Champions Cup
European Rugby Champions Cup
European Rugby Champions Cup
European Rugby Champions Cup
European Rugby Champions Cup
European Rugby Champions Cup
European Rugby Champions Cup seasons